Ewen Maclean, 9th Laird of Ardgour was the son of John 'Crubach' Maclean, 8th Laird of Ardgour and his first wife, Anne, daughter of Angus Campbell, Captain of Dunstaffnage.

Biography
He married Mary, daughter of Lachlan MacLean of Lochbuie, and had by her:
Allan Maclean, 10th Laird of Ardgour, born in 1668
Donald Maclean, who married Janet, daughter of Lachlan MacLean of Calgary
Charles Maclean
John Maclean
Lachlan Maclean who was a lieutenant in the Spanish service, and was killed in a duel at Madrid.
Ewen was succeeded in the estates by his son, Allan.

References

Year of birth missing
Year of death missing
Ewen
Lairds of Ardgour